The 2011 NCAA Division I FBS football season was the highest level of college football competition in the United States organized by the National Collegiate Athletic Association (NCAA).

The regular season began on September 1, 2011 and ended on December 10, 2011. The postseason concluded on January 9, 2012 with the BCS National Championship Game at the Mercedes-Benz Superdome in New Orleans. The No. 2 Alabama Crimson Tide defeated the No. 1 LSU Tigers 21–0.  For the first time since 2007, and for only the third time in the Bowl Championship Series era, no team from an automatic-qualifying BCS conference finished the season with an undefeated record.

Rule changes
Several rule changes took effect this season:
 If a player is penalized for unsportsmanlike conduct for actions that occurred during a play ending in a touchdown, but before the goal line was crossed, the touchdown will be nullified and the fifteen-yard penalty enforced from the spot of the foul. This change was made the year after Georgia receiver A. J. Green was called for a personal foul after catching a pass for a touchdown against LSU. The fifteen-yard penalty was assessed on the resulting kickoff, which helped LSU's position for the winning score. In another game, North Dakota State defensive back Josh Gatlin pointed at the crowd at the seven-yard line before scoring a touchdown against South Dakota State. Gatlin received a penalty, but the touchdown was not taken back. A similar proposal that would have nullified touchdowns for taunting or excessive celebration after the score failed to pass the NCAA Football Rules Committee.
 Due to how the fourth quarter ended in the 2010 Music City Bowl, a 10-second runoff will be implemented (similar to the NFL rule adopted in 1980) when a team commits a foul in the final minute of either half that results in a clock stoppage.  The opposing team has the option to:
Take the penalty yardage and the 10 second runoff.
Take the penalty yardage and decline the 10 second runoff.
Decline both the penalty and the 10 second runoff.
 Each half of a game can end due to a runoff of the game clock following a penalty. Teams can take a time-out to stop the clock and avoid the 10 second runoff. The new rule has been informally dubbed the "Dooley Rule", after then Tennessee head coach Derek Dooley.
 Video monitors will be allowed in coaches' booths to allow coaching staffs to determine whether they should challenge a call. The televisions will have access only to the live broadcast feed, with no video recorders. The technology, if made available at a stadium, must be provided to both teams.
 Players lined up outside the tackle box—more specifically, those lined up more than 7 yards from the center—will now be allowed to block below the waist only if they are blocking straight ahead or toward the nearest sideline.
 On placekicks, no offensive lineman can now be engaged by more than two defensive players. A violation will be a 5–yard penalty.
 A three-man wedge is prohibited during kickoffs and punts. The penalty will be a fifteen-yard penalty from the spot of the foul, if non-contact, or from the end of the run, if contact.
 Players will no longer be required to wear pants that cover the knees.
 The officials' uniforms were slightly changed.  The shirt stripes are wider, they now wear black pants instead of white, and the initial of the official's role (ex. "R" for referee, "U" for umpire) is displayed on the front uniform pocket.

In addition, the NCAA recommends that conferences without a pregame warm-up policy should use a ten-yard, no-player zone between the 45-yard lines beginning 60 minutes before kickoff.

Conference realignment

Membership changes
Five FBS schools switched conferences prior to the 2011 season. Each of these moves had been formally announced in 2010.

On April 20, 2011, UMass announced that it would upgrade its football program to the FBS level and become a football-only member of the Mid-American Conference beginning in 2012. Full FBS membership and eligibility for the conference championship and bowl games would follow in 2013.

On September 18, the Atlantic Coast Conference announced that Big East Conference mainstays Pittsburgh and Syracuse had been officially accepted as the conference's 13th and 14th members. At the time, the two schools' departure date was uncertain, as Big East bylaws require a 27-month notice period for departing members. The earliest that Pitt and Syracuse could join the ACC was July 2014, though later negotiations would allow Pitt and Syracuse to join in July 2013.

On September 26, the Southeastern Conference announced that Texas A&M would leave the Big 12 Conference and become the league's 13th member in July 2012. Missouri also announced plans to depart the Big 12 to join the SEC on November 6, bringing SEC conference membership to 14 schools.

Facing the imminent loss of four members, the Big 12 announced the addition of TCU from the Mountain West Conference on October 10. In order to join the Big 12, TCU had to renege on an agreement it had made less than year earlier to join the Big East.

On October 14, the Mountain West and Conference USA announced their intention to merge their football operations and form a two-division, 22-team conference in hopes of earning an automatic qualifier to a BCS bowl. The agreement was abandoned in 2012 after both conferences added new members.

The next change came on October 28, when the Big 12 formally accepted West Virginia from the Big East. This move led to a legal battle in which West Virginia filed suit against the Big East to overturn the standard 27-month notice period, and the Big East suing in another court to have the requirement enforced. In February 2012, the two parties reached a settlement that allowed West Virginia to join the Big 12 that July. Several months later, both Pittsburgh and Syracuse reached their own settlements with the Big East that allowed them to leave for the ACC in July 2013.

Changes in membership reduced the number of teams in the Big 12 from twelve to ten for the 2011 season and beyond, forcing the conference to drop its annual football championship game to comply with NCAA rules.

In response to the departures of three mainstay members and TCU, the Big East announced on December 7 that five schools would join the conference for football in 2013: Houston, SMU, and UCF would join as full members in all sports, while Boise State and San Diego State would leave the Mountain West and become football-only members.  Boise State's other sports would return to the Western Athletic Conference, while San Diego State's would rejoin the Big West after a 35-year absence. Later developments in conference realignment, namely the demise of both the Big East and WAC's football competitions following the 2012 season, prompted both schools to abandon these plans and remain the Mountain West.

New and updated stadiums

New stadiums

Expanded stadium
North Carolina continued renovations to Kenan Memorial Stadium, which were completed in time for the start of the season. The project included a new student center and premium seating sections. The addition of new seats enclosed the stadium for the first time and brought the total capacity to 63,000.

Temporary stadiums
 California played the season at AT&T Park in San Francisco, home to the San Francisco Giants of Major League Baseball. California Memorial Stadium, the Golden Bears' on-campus home since 1923, was undergoing a major renovation that included a full seismic retrofit. The Bears returned to Memorial Stadium in 2012. Although AT&T Park is primarily a baseball venue, it has hosted several football teams and events; at that time, it was home to the Fight Hunger Bowl.
 Washington played the first six games of its home schedule at on-campus Husky Stadium. Following the November 5 game against Oregon, construction began on a $280 million renovation project. As a result, the Apple Cup rivalry game with Washington State was moved to CenturyLink Field. Washington remained at CenturyLink Field for the entire 2012 season.

Infractions, investigations, and scandals

Ohio State
Five Ohio State players were alleged to have improperly traded dozens of items to the owner of a tattoo parlor in exchange for tattoos, cash, and, in one case, a sport-utility vehicle. The players, along with head coach Jim Tressel, were suspended for the first five games of the 2011 season. Tressel was under investigation for lying to the university and investigators regarding his knowledge of the incident. The program was also under investigation by the NCAA, the school having going before the NCAA Committee on Infractions in August 2011, with findings and decisions following shortly thereafter. The scandal led to the resignation of Tressel on May 30. On June 8, starting quarterback Terrelle Pryor, one of the five suspended players, announced that he would forgo his final year of college eligibility.

Initially, Ohio State offered to vacate its entire 2010 season, return money received from the 2011 Sugar Bowl, impose two years of probation, and use five fewer football scholarships over the next three seasons. However, after the school went before the NCAA, further rules violations emerged. Three players were suspended before the start of the season for receiving $200 from a booster. Then, midway through the season, it was discovered that the same booster had overpaid several players for summer jobs.

The NCAA announced its final penalties on December 20. While accepting Ohio State's initial self-imposed penalties, it levied additional sanctions. One extra year of probation and scholarship reductions was added, running through the 2014 season. The Buckeyes will also be banned from postseason play in 2012. Tressel, who joined the staff of the Indianapolis Colts during the 2011 NFL season and has since taken a non-athletic position at his alma mater of the University of Akron, was hit with a five-year show-cause penalty, which effectively bars him from college coaching through the 2016 season. Finally, the school was required to disassociate itself from Pryor for five years.

North Carolina
The North Carolina Tar Heels, in the midst of an NCAA investigation into improper benefits and academic misconduct within the football program, fired head coach Butch Davis on July 27.

The school initially vacated its 2008 and 2009 seasons, reduced its scholarship allotment by nine over the next three seasons, and self-imposed two years of probation. Although the NCAA praised the university for its investigation, it found several aggravating factors. The NCAA confirmed academic fraud, found that players had received at least $31,000 in impermissible benefits, determined that six players had played while ineligible, and also found evidence of rampant agent involvement in the program. The NCAA added an extra year of probation, and also banned the Tar Heels from the 2012 postseason. John Blake, an assistant who had been forced out with Davis, was found to have received personal loans from agent Gary Wichard that he did not report to UNC, specifically for access to players. He was also cited for not cooperating with investigators. Blake received a three-year show-cause penalty.

Miami

On August 16, Yahoo! Sports broke a story in which former Miami Hurricanes booster Nevin Shapiro, currently imprisoned for running a Ponzi scheme, stated that from 2002 through 2010 he had given massive amounts of improper benefits to Miami players and coaches, mostly in football but also in men's basketball. Shapiro indicated that the benefits included cash, various goods, prostitutes, and even an abortion.

Penn State

On November 5, former Penn State assistant Jerry Sandusky was indicted on multiple felony charges of sex abuse against minors. Two other high-ranking Penn State administrators—athletic director Tim Curley and vice president for business and finance Gary Schultz (whose job includes supervision of the university police department)—were charged with perjury in the case. The day after the indictments, the university Board of Trustees held an emergency meeting, at which Curley requested to be placed on administrative leave and Schultz stepped down. Paterno, who had received notice of inappropriate behavior by Sandusky in 2002 and had reported the allegations to university administrators (though not to police), was not charged or implicated in any wrongdoing. On November 9, he announced his retirement effective at the end of the season, stating he was "absolutely devastated by the developments in this case."  However, hours later, the Penn State Board of Trustees fired Paterno, effective immediately.

Regular season top 10 matchups
Rankings reflect the AP Poll. Rankings for Week 8 and beyond will list BCS Rankings first and AP Poll second. Teams that failed to be a top 10 team for one poll or the other will be noted.
Week 1
No. 4 LSU defeated No. 3 Oregon, 40–27 (Cowboys Stadium, Arlington, Texas)
Week 3
No. 1 Oklahoma defeated No. 5 Florida State, 23–13 (Doak Campbell Stadium, Tallahassee, Florida)
Week 4
No. 7 Oklahoma State defeated No. 8 Texas A&M, 30–29 (Kyle Field, College Station, Texas)
Week 5
No. 7 Wisconsin defeated No. 8 Nebraska, 48–17 (Camp Randall Stadium, Madison, Wisconsin)
Week 9
No. 9/11 Oklahoma defeated No. 8/10 Kansas State, 58–17 (KSU Stadium, Manhattan, Kansas)
Week 10
No. 1/1 LSU defeated No. 2/2 Alabama, 9–6 OT (Bryant–Denny Stadium, Tuscaloosa, Alabama)
No. 7/8 Arkansas defeated No. 9/10 South Carolina, 44–28 (Donald W. Reynolds Razorback Stadium, Fayetteville, Arkansas)
Week 11
No. 6/7 Oregon defeated No. 4/3 Stanford, 53–30 (Stanford Stadium, Stanford, California)
Week 13
No. 1/1 LSU defeated No. 3/3 Arkansas, 41–17 (Tiger Stadium, Baton Rouge, Louisiana)
Week 14
No. 3/3 Oklahoma State defeated No. 10/13 Oklahoma, 44–10 (Boone Pickens Stadium, Stillwater, Oklahoma)

Conference standings

Conference summaries
Rankings reflect the Week 14 AP Poll before the games were played.

Conference championship games

Other conference champions

Final BCS rankings

Bowl games

2012 Bowl Championship Series

Other bowl games

Bowl Challenge Cup standings

Awards and honors

Heisman Trophy
The Heisman Trophy is given to the year's most outstanding player.

Other major awards
AP Player of the Year: Robert Griffin III, Baylor
Maxwell Award (top player): Andrew Luck, Stanford
Walter Camp Award (top player): Andrew Luck, Stanford
Campbell Trophy ("academic Heisman"; formerly the Draddy Trophy): Andrew Rodriguez, Army
Wuerffel Trophy (humanitarian-athlete): Barrett Jones, Alabama
Paul Hornung Award (most versatile player): Brandon Boykin, Georgia
Burlsworth Trophy (top player who began as walk-on): Austin Davis, Southern Miss

Offense
Quarterback
Davey O'Brien Award (quarterback): Robert Griffin III, Baylor
Johnny Unitas Award (senior/4th year quarterback): Andrew Luck, Stanford
Manning Award (quarterback): Robert Griffin III, Baylor
Sammy Baugh Trophy (quarterback, specifically passer): Case Keenum, Houston

Running Back
Doak Walker Award (running back): Trent Richardson, Alabama

Wide Receiver
Fred Biletnikoff Award (wide receiver): Justin Blackmon, Oklahoma State

Tight End
John Mackey Award (tight end): Dwayne Allen, Clemson

Lineman
Dave Rimington Trophy (center): David Molk, Michigan
Outland Trophy (interior lineman): Barrett Jones, Alabama

Defense
Bronko Nagurski Trophy (defensive player): Luke Kuechly, Boston College
Chuck Bednarik Award (defensive player): Tyrann Mathieu, LSU
Lott Trophy (defensive impact): Luke Kuechly, Boston College

Defensive Line
Ted Hendricks Award (defensive end): Whitney Mercilus, Illinois
Lombardi Award (defensive lineman): Luke Kuechly, Boston College
Linebacker
Dick Butkus Award (linebacker): Luke Kuechly, Boston College

Defensive Back
Jim Thorpe Award (defensive back): Morris Claiborne, LSU

Special teams
Lou Groza Award (placekicker): Randy Bullock, Texas A&M
Ray Guy Award (punter): Ryan Allen, Louisiana Tech

Coaches
AP Coach of the Year: Les Miles, LSU
Paul "Bear" Bryant Award: Mike Gundy, Oklahoma State
The Home Depot Coach of the Year Award: Les Miles, LSU
Walter Camp Coach of the Year: Les Miles, LSU
Eddie Robinson Coach of the Year: Mike Gundy, Oklahoma State
Bobby Dodd Coach of the Year Award: Dabo Swinney, Clemson
Bobby Bowden National Collegiate Coach of the Year Award: Nick Saban, Alabama
Assistant
Broyles Award (assistant coach): John Chavis, LSU

All-Americans

Records
 Several significant records were tied or broken on October 22:
 East Carolina quarterback Dominique Davis set two FBS records for consecutive pass completions in the Pirates' 38–35 win over Navy.
 Davis completed his first 26 pass attempts, breaking the single-game record of 23 first set in 1998 by Tee Martin of Tennessee against South Carolina and tied in 2004 by Aaron Rodgers of California against USC.
 Since Davis had also completed his final 10 passes in the Pirates' game the previous week against Memphis, his streak against Navy gave him a total of 36 consecutive completions over two games, breaking the record of 26 set by Rodgers in 2004.
 Boise State quarterback Kellen Moore led the Broncos to a 37–26 win over Air Force, giving him 45 career wins as a starter. This tied the FBS record of Texas' Colt McCoy (2006–2009); after a bye week, Moore could (and ultimately did) take sole possession of the record at UNLV on November 5. He finished his career 50–3.
 In Houston's 63–28 win over Marshall, Cougars quarterback Case Keenum set a new FBS record for career total offense, surpassing the 16,910 yards amassed by Timmy Chang of Hawaii from 2000 to 2004. He also brought his career total of touchdowns accounted for (combined passing, rushing, receiving, and returns) to 150, tying the record set by Central Michigan's Dan LeFevour from 2006 to 2009.
 Penn State head coach Joe Paterno, already the holder of the record for most career wins in FBS, tied Eddie Robinson of Grambling for the most wins in Division I history, with 408, when the Nittany Lions defeated Northwestern 34–24. Paterno, in what would prove to be his final game coached, would claim the record outright the following week, when Penn State defeated Illinois in a defensive struggle, 10–7.
 On October 27, Keenum's nine touchdown passes in Houston's 73–34 win over crosstown rival Rice gave him 139 for his college career, surpassing the previous record of 134 by Texas Tech's Graham Harrell from 2005 to 2008. He also took sole possession of the record for most touchdowns accounted for, with 159 (and counting).
 On October 29, Paterno took sole possession of the record for most career wins by a Division I head coach when Penn State defeated Illinois 10–7. This would prove to be Paterno's final game, as he would be fired less than two weeks later in the midst of a sexual abuse scandal (more details below).
 On November 5:
 In Houston's 56–13 pasting of UAB, Keenum broke Chang's record for career passing yards, ending the game with 17,212.
 Boise State defeated UNLV 48–21, giving Moore his 46th career win as a starter and sole possession of that record.
 On November 19, Keenum added another major FBS record to his collection, surpassing Harrell's previous record of 1,403 career completions in the first quarter of Houston's 37–7 win over SMU. Keenum ended with 1,427 completions.
 On November 26, Kentucky defeated Tennessee for the first time since 1984. The Wildcats' 10–7 win ended the longest current losing streak against an annual opponent in FBS at 26.

Coaching changes

Preseason and in-season
This is restricted to coaching changes that took place on or after May 1, 2011. For coaching changes that occurred earlier in 2011, see 2010 NCAA Division I FBS end-of-season coaching changes.

End of season

TV ratings

Most watched regular season games in 2011

See also

2011 NCAA Division I FBS football rankings

References
Notes

External links